Stegommata is a genus of moths in the family Lyonetiidae.

Species
Stegommata hesperias Meyrick, 1893  
Stegommata leptomitella Meyrick, 1880  
Stegommata sulfuratella Meyrick, 1880

External links
Butterflies and Moths of the World Generic Names and their Type-species

Lyonetiidae